Omar Al-Abdallat (transliterated: `Umar al-`Abdallāt) is a Jordanian singer-songwriter credited with popularizing Bedouin music. He has produced and/or performed a number of Jordanian patriotic standards, including "Hashimi, Hashimi" and "Jeishana" in addition to traditional Jordanian songs. He has also represented Jordan in multicultural events throughout the world. He is also popular in various cities of other Arab countries.

Awards 

 Order of Culture, Science and Arts the "level of brilliance"

See also
Music of Jordan

References

External links
Omar Al-Abdillat Songs

Living people
Jordanian male singers
Jordanian male actors
Jordanian male film actors
Jordanian male television actors
1972 births